Dayaha is a town in the Sanaag region of Somaliland.

Overview 
Dayaha is 20km west of Erigavo, the administrative seat of the Sanaag region the town lies in. Other nearby cities and towns include Burao (363km), El Afweyn (85km) and Garadag (160km).

Demographics 
Dayaha is exclusively populated by the Muse Abokor Aduruxmiin  l sub-division of the Habar jeclo  Isaaq.

See also
Administrative divisions of Somaliland
Regions of Somaliland
Districts of Somaliland
Somalia–Somaliland border

References 

Populated places in Sanaag